Philip Mead may refer to:

 Phil Mead (1887–1958),  English cricketer
 Philip Mead (historian), American historian